Justan may refer to:

Justan I ibn Marzuban I, the Sallarid ruler of Azerbaijan
Justan III, the sixth king of the Justanid dynasty
Justann Crawford (born 1973), retired indigenous Australian Olympic boxer
Kurkir ibn Justan, a Daylamite military officer of the Buyids
Takyeh-ye Justan, a village in Bala Taleqan Rural District

See also 
 Justen (disambiguation)
 Justin (disambiguation)
 Juston (disambiguation)
 Justyn (disambiguation)